Bryan Michael Limbombe Ekango (born 14 May 2001) is a Belgian professional footballer who plays as a left winger for Eerste Divisie club Roda JC.

Club career

Genk
On 26 August 2017, Genk announced that 16-year-old Limbombe had signed his first professional contract with them, as he left the youth academy of Zulte Waregem.

On 19 January 2020, Limbombe made his professional debut for Genk in the league match against his former club Zulte Waregem, coming on as a substitute for Jere Uronen in a 3–0 win. Two days after his debut, Genk announced through its official channels that Limbombe's contract was extended until June 2024.

Roda JC
On 24 August 2021, Limbombe signed a two-year contract with Eerste Divisie club Roda JC. He made his competitive debut for the club on 10 September in a 0–0 league draw against NAC Breda. On 17 September, he scored his first goals for the club, a brace, to secure a 2–0 victory against TOP Oss. He finished his first season with 36 total appearances in which he scored seven goals, as Roda eventually lost out on promotion in the play-offs after a loss in extra time to Excelsior.

Personal life
Born in Belgium, Limbombe is of Congolese descent. He is the brother of the footballers Anthony, Stallone and Maxime Limbombe.

Career statistics

References

External links
 
 

2001 births
Living people
Sportspeople from Mechelen
Footballers from Antwerp Province
Belgian footballers
Belgium youth international footballers
Belgian expatriate footballers
Belgian people of Democratic Republic of the Congo descent
Association football midfielders
Belgian Pro League players
Eerste Divisie players
S.V. Zulte Waregem players
K.R.C. Genk players
Roda JC Kerkrade players
Expatriate footballers in the Netherlands
Belgian expatriate sportspeople in the Netherlands